Kelly Vollebregt (born 1 January 1995) is a Dutch female handballer who plays for Odense Håndbold and the Dutch national team.

International honours 
EHF Cup:
Finalist: 2016
Semifinalist: 2017

Individual awards  
 All-Star Right Wing of the Junior European Championship: 2013

References

1995 births
Living people
Sportspeople from Delft
Dutch female handball players
Expatriate handball players
Dutch expatriate sportspeople in Germany
21st-century Dutch women